Tsoro Yematatu is a two-player abstract strategy game from Zimbabwe.  Players first drop their three pieces onto the board, and then move them to create a 3 in-a-row which wins the game.  It is similar to games like Tapatan, Achi, Nine Holes, Shisima, and Tant Fant.  However, what makes this game unique is that pieces can jump over each other (without capture) which adds an extra dimension in the maneuverability of the pieces.

There is some uncertainty about the correct name as Tsoro YeMaMutatu is also used; 'Ma' or 'Mai' being the chiKaranga for 'mother'...hence 'MaMutatu' means 'Mother Mutatu'.

Goal 

To be first to create a 3 in-a-row with one's pieces

Equipment 

The board is an isosceles triangle with one line across its breadth, and another line running down the length of the board down its central axis.  This creates for seven intersection points of which the pieces can be played upon. Other variations of the board are also used, such as a square board divided by 4 lines, creating an asterisk-style pattern with 8 triangle spaces for pieces to be placed on.  

Each player has 3 pieces.  One plays the black pieces, and the other player plays the white pieces.

Game Play and Rules 

1.  The board is empty in the beginning.  Players decide what color pieces to play, and who starts first.  

2. Each player drops one piece per turn on any vacant point on the board.  Players alternate their turns.  Pieces cannot be moved until all six pieces have been dropped.  Observe that after all pieces have been dropped, there is only one vacant point on the board.

3.  A piece can be moved one of two ways:  a) A piece can move one space per turn onto a vacant point following the pattern on the board, or b) a piece can jump over another piece (friend or foe) adjacent to it, and land on a vacant point on the other side; the jump must be in a straight line and follow the pattern on the board.  There are no captures in this game.

4.  The game can last a very long time, and if no one is still able to create the 3 in-a-row, the players can agree to a draw.

Related Games 

Tapatan, Achi, Nine Holes, Tant Fant, Shisima, Tic-tac-toe, Tsoro, Tsoro YemuTwelve

External links 
 Tsoro Yematatu (Cincinnati Art Museum)
 Online version of Tsoro Yematatu (without jumping)

Abstract strategy games
Traditional board games
Zimbabwean culture
African games